Lieutenant-Colonel Sir Peter Wyldebore Gibbs  (1 January 1934, London – 2001) was Private Secretary to Anne, Princess Royal, from 1982 to 1997.

Educated at the Royal Military Academy, Sandhurst, Gibbs was commissioned into the Coldstream Guards on 25 July 1953, and promoted to Lieutenant-Colonel in 1974. He became Assistant Adjutant-General London District in 1977, and his last posting was as a staff officer (GSOI) in the Ministry of Defence. He retired from the British Army in 1982 and joined the Office of the Princess Royal. Colonel Gibbs was appointed LVO in 1989 and promoted to CVO, 1995, and KCVO, 1997.

The Household of the Princess Royal provides the administrative support to Her Royal Highness, the only daughter of Queen Elizabeth II. It is based at Buckingham Palace, and is headed by the Private Secretary. The Household is separate from the Royal Household and is funded from the Civil List annuity paid to the Princess Royal for her public duties – which is however reimbursed to HM Treasury by Her Majesty the Queen.

References 

1934 births
2001 deaths
Coldstream Guards officers
Knights Commander of the Royal Victorian Order
Graduates of the Royal Military Academy Sandhurst
People educated at Eton College
British military personnel of the Aden Emergency
Civil servants from London
Military personnel from London